The royal blue hap (Otopharynx heterodon) is a species of cichlid endemic to Lake Malawi.  This species can reach a length of  TL.  It can also be found in the aquarium trade.

References

External links
 Photo

Royal blue hap
Fish described in 1935
Taxonomy articles created by Polbot